San Marcos is a city and the county seat of Hays County, Texas, United States. The city's limits extend into Caldwell and Guadalupe Counties, as well. San Marcos is on the Interstate 35 corridor between Austin and San Antonio. Its population was 44,894 at the 2010 census and 67,553 at the 2020 census.
Founded on the banks of the San Marcos River, the area is thought to be among the oldest continuously inhabited sites in the Americas. San Marcos is home to Texas State University and the Meadows Center for Water and the Environment.

In 2010, San Marcos was listed in Business Weeks fourth annual survey of the "Best Places to Raise your Kids". In 2013 and 2014, the United States Census Bureau named it the fastest-growing city in the United States. In December 2013, it was named number nine on Business Insiders list of the "10 Most Exciting Small Cities In America".

History

Archeologists have found evidence at the San Marcos River associated with the Clovis culture, which suggests that the river has been the site of human habitation for more than 10,000 years.  The San Marcos Springs are the third-largest collection of springs in Texas. Never in recorded history has the river run dry.

In 1689, Spaniard Alonso de León led an expedition from Mexico to explore Texas and establish missions and presidios in the region. De León's party helped blaze the Camino Real (later known as the Old San Antonio Road), which followed present-day Hunter Road, Hopkins Street, and Aquarena Springs Drive (the route later shifted four miles to the south; it is now followed by County Road 266, known locally as Old Bastrop Highway). De León's party reached the river on April 25, the feast day of St. Mark the Evangelist; the river was thus named the San Marcos.

In January 1808, a small group of Spanish-Mexican families settled at the Old Bastrop Highway crossing of the river, and named the settlement Villa de San Marcos de Neve.  The settlers were plagued by floods and Indian raids, and the settlement was abandoned in 1812.

In November 1846, the first Anglo-American settlers moved into the vicinity of the San Marcos Springs.  The Texas Legislature organized Hays County on March 1, 1848, and designated San Marcos as the county seat.  In 1851, a town center was laid out about a mile southwest of the headwaters of the river.  The town became a center for ginning and milling local agricultural products.  The town's most notable founder and early settler was Gen. Edward Burleson, a hero of the Texas Revolution and former vice president of the Republic of Texas.  Burleson built a dam on the upper reaches of the river in 1849.  The dam powered several mills, including one within present-day Sewell Park.

In the decade following the arrival of the International-Great Northern Railroad on September 30, 1880, cattle and cotton provided the basis for the growth of San Marcos as a center for commerce and transportation.

In 1866, the Coronal Institute was established as an early private high school. In 1899, Southwest Texas State Normal School (now known as Texas State University) was established as a teacher's college to meet demand for public school teachers in Texas. In 1907, the San Marcos Baptist Academy was established, furthering education as an important industry for the town. The demands of World War II forced the town's industry to diversify, and with the emergence of a manufacturing and light industrial sector, the town began to experience growth.

In the late 1940s, former Hollywood director Shadrack Graham produced a documentary about daily life in San Marcos as part of his "Our Hometown" series of films that encouraged commerce and civic activity in small communities. The film highlights several local businesses from the era, including Smith's Flowers, Waldrin's Cleaners, Lack's Furniture, and the Palace Movie Theater.

Gary Air Force Base, just east of town, was opened in 1942 as San Marcos Army Airfield, renamed San Marcos Air Force Base in 1947, and renamed finally in 1953 in honor of Lieutenant Arthur Edward Gary, killed at Clark Field in the Philippines on December 7, 1941, the first San Martian to die in World War II.  During the war, the base trained over 10,000 navigators, and in the following years was the largest center of Air Force and Army helicopter training for pilots and mechanics in the United States, with 21 squadrons and 4800 personnel stationed there.  The base was handed over to the Army in 1956, renamed Camp Gary, and was closed in 1963.  Subsequently, part of the base was taken over by the city for use as San Marcos Airport, while another part was reopened in 1966 as the Gary Job Corps Center.

In the 1960s, with the establishment of Aquarena Springs and Wonder World as attractions, the tourist industry became a growing part of the city's economy. By the 1960s, what was then named Southwest Texas State University had grown into an important regional institution, and when coupled with the creation of Gary Job Corps Training Center in 1965, education became the largest industry in San Marcos. The remarkable growth explosion of Austin further allowed San Marcos to prosper.

By 1973, San Marcos and Hays County were included by the U. S. Census Bureau in the Austin metropolitan statistical area. By that year, the city's population had grown to 25,000 citizens, along with an additional Southwest Texas State University student body of 20,000.

By 1990, the city's population had grown to 28,743, by 2000, it reached 34,733, and by 2010, it was 44,894. A report, released by the U.S. Census Bureau in May 2013, stated that San Marcos had the highest rate of growth among all U.S. cities and towns with at least 50,000 people. Its population rose 6.9% between 2011 and 2012. The university, now known as Texas State University, boasts a student body of 34,225.

In 1991, protestors advocating for legalization of marijuana conducted a civil disobedience action and were arrested; they became known as the San Marcos Seven.

Demographics

As of the 2020 United States census, 67,553 people, 23,769 households, and 10,635 families were residing in the city.

As of the census of 2010, the population was 44,894 people in the city. In 2000, 34,733 people, 12,660 households, and 5,380 families resided in the city. The population density was 1,907.5 people per square mile, (736.4/km2) in 2000. The 13,340 housing units averaged 732.6 per square mile (282.8/km2). The racial makeup of the city was 72.55% White, 5.53% African American, 0.65% Native American, 1.23% Asian, 0.11% Pacific Islander, 17.03% from other races, and 2.90% from two or more races. Hispanics or Latinos of any race were 36.50% of the population.

Of the 12,660 households, 19.2% had children under 18 living with them, 27.9% were married couples living together, 10.1% had a female householder with no husband present, and 57.5% were not families. About 31.0% of all households were made up of individuals, and 5.7% had someone living alone who was 65  or older. The average household size was 2.31, and the average family size was 3.08.

In the city, the population was distributed as 15.4% under 18, 41.9% from 18 to 24, 24.8% from 25 to 44, 10.7% from 45 to 64, and 7.2% who were 65  or older. The median age was 23 years. For every 100 females, there were 96.8 males. For every 100 females age 18 and over, there were 95.4 males.

The median income for a household in the city was $25,809, and for a family was $37,113. Males had a median income of $25,400 versus $22,953 for females. The per capita income for the city was $13,468. About 13.8% of families and 28.5% of the population were below the poverty line, including 22.1% of those under age 18 and 15.1% of those age 65 or over.

Geography
San Marcos is in Central Texas. Interstate 35 is the main highway through it, with access from exits 199 through 208. It is situated on the Balcones Fault, the boundary between the Hill Country to the west and the Coastal Plains to the east. Along the fault, many springs emerge, such as San Marcos Springs, which forms Spring Lake and is the source of the San Marcos River. The eastern part is Blackland Prairie. The western part consists of forested or grassy rolling hills, often marked with cacti.

The San Marcos River and the Blanco River, part of the Guadalupe watershed, flow through the city, along with Cottonwood Creek, Purgatory Creek, Sink Creek, and Willow Springs Creek.

Climate
The climate in this area is characterized by hot, humid summers and generally mild to cool winters, with some winter frost at night. Annual precipitation is about 34 inches (864 mm). According to the Köppen climate classification, San Marcos has a humid subtropical climate, Cfa on climate maps.

Government
In 2022, city voters approved the decriminalization of possession of misdemeanor amounts of marijuana.

Education

San Marcos is home to Texas State University, a multidisciplinary public research university that was established in 1899.

For primary and secondary education, San Marcos is served by the San Marcos Consolidated Independent School District. San Marcos High School is the district's sole high school. San Marcos Academy, a private high school, is in the city. Doris Miller Middle School and Owen Goodnight Middle School are the two middle schools located in San Marcos. San Marcos is home to seven elementary schools: Rodriguez, Hernandez, Mendez, Crockett, Travis, Bowie, and DeZavala Elementary Schools. The city also houses a prekindergarten school, named Bonham Pre-K.

San Marcos is also served by the Hays Consolidated Independent School District, in which Blanco Vista Elementary School is located within the San Marcos city limits in the extreme northeastern part of the city.

The Forensic Anthropology Center at Texas State is one of the four extant body farms in the United States and the largest such forensics research facility in the world.

San Marcos is also home to Aquarena Center, the Meadows Center for Water and the Environment, the San Marcos National Fish Hatchery and Aquatic Resource Center, the A. E. Wood Texas Fish Hatchery, the San Marcos Nature Center, the Centro Cultural Hispano de San Marcos, and the Indigenous Cultures Institute.

Transportation
 Capital Area Rural Transportation System
 San Marcos Municipal Airport
 San Marcos Station is served by Amtrak's Texas Eagle

Economy

San Marcos' central location along IH-35 and strong infrastructure makes it ideal for industry. It includes business incentives, a high quality of life, regional airports and proximity to major international airports, access to major roadways such as IH-35, SH-130, US-183, and IH-10, networking opportunities and support for small businesses and entrepreneurs, a healthy tax structure, and a diverse and talented workforce.

The top employers in 2021 are the following:

Along with its easy access to air travel, San Marcos has ready access to several freight routes and IH-35 and IH-10, which run north/south and east/west, respectively, through the region. The access points of the area provide an easy route to major cities in Texas such as Austin, San Antonio, Dallas, and Houston.

The region has several institutions of higher education that provide a continual source of talent for the region's workforce. These institutions include the fourth-largest university in the state, Texas State University, as well as Gary Job Corps, an education and career technical training program.

The area's quality of life is highlighted by the San Marcos River, which is naturally fed by the San Marcos Springs.  Many other lakes and rivers dot the local landscape, and the region's location within the Texas Hill Country provides easy access to the many outdoor amenities. In June 2006, The View named the San Marcos Outlet Malls as the third-best place to shop in the world. About 14 million people visit them annually.

Parks and recreation

The San Marcos and Blanco Rivers flow through the city, along with Cottonwood Creek, Purgatory Creek, Sink Creek, and Willow Springs Creek. Each of these rivers and creeks has parks or nature preserves with hiking trails along it.

The San Marcos River rises from the San Marcos Springs. The springs are home to several threatened or endangered species, including the Texas blind salamander, San Marcos salamander, fountain darter, San Marcos gambusia, and Texas wild rice. The river begins at San Marcos Springs, rising from the Edwards Aquifer into Spring Lake. The upper river flows through Texas State University and San Marcos and is a popular recreational area. It is joined by the Blanco River after four miles, passes through Luling and near Gonzales, and flows into the Guadalupe River after 75 miles (121 km). This course is the first leg of the Texas Water Safari, marketed as the "World's Toughest Canoe Race".  
San Marcos has many areas meant for recreation, but one of the most popular is Sewell Park. It is an open area along part of the San Marcos River. Because of its location on the Texas State University campus, the park is a popular spot for college students to swim, play, or just hang out. Many activities are available at Sewell Park, such as volleyball, picnics, and swimming/tubing. It is also known for being the spot where some newly graduated Texas State students jump into the San Marcos River after their graduation ceremony.

Sports

Many residents of San Marcos support the athletic programs of Texas State University, known as the Texas State Bobcats. The football program won the NCAA Division II National Championships in 1982 and 1983 and now competes in the NCAA Division I (FBS) Sun Belt Conference. The Texas State Bobcats play home games in Bobcat Stadium, seating over 33,000 fans. Basketball and volleyball games are played at Strahan Arena. Baseball games are played at Bobcat Ballpark.

Amateur sports car racing takes place at Harris Hill Raceway.

Arts and culture

In 2010, San Marcos was listed in Business Week magazine's fourth annual survey of the "Best Places to Raise your Kids." In 2013 and 2014, the United States Census Bureau named it the fastest-growing city in the United States. In December 2013, it was named #9 on the Business Insider list of the "10 Most Exciting Small Cities In America."

The river is a popular recreational area and is frequented by residents and tourists for tubing, canoeing, swimming, and fishing. The Texas Water Safari starts in San Marcos on the first Saturday in June each year. Due in part to its natural beauty, the city was nicknamed "San Marvelous". San Marcos references the nickname in its "Keep San Marcos Beautiful" campaign.

The town center (referred to locally as "the square") was laid out in 1851 and is listed in the National Register of Historic Places. The Hays County Courthouse, which sits in the center, was built in 1908. The downtown area surrounding the courthouse is home to many of the city's bars, restaurants, boutiques, and music venues, making it a top entertainment destination. The Marc, directly across the street from the courthouse, hosted the 2011, 2012, and 2013 Lone Star Music Awards.

In addition to the historic downtown, San Marcos has five residential historic districts. It also boasts of at least 40 homes and buildings on the National Register of Historic Places.

Local media include the San Marcos Daily Record and The University Star.

Public art
 
The City of San Marcos and the San Marcos Arts Commission in collaboration with a committee of citizens from the community and Texas State University broke ground in January 2013 on a commemorative sculpture that will sit at the intersection of LBJ Drive and MLK Drive. Designed by Aaron P. Hussey of Baton Rouge,  it depicts Johnson and King conversing in the Oval Office. It was officially unveiled on Martin Luther King Jr. Day in 2014.

The Walkers' Gallery:  In July 1997, the City of San Marcos Department of Parks and Recreation opened the San Marcos Activity Center. Along with the recreational facilities and meeting rooms, this new building debuted an extensive community art gallery.  The gallery is directed and curated by the San Marcos Area Arts Council, a nonprofit organization, and is sustained through grants from the San Marcos Arts Commission.   Named the Walkers' Gallery because of its placement in the walking corridors of the building, it displays seven diverse exhibits a year, primarily of art by area artists and occasional invitational exhibits.  The public can enter the Activity Center to see the exhibits and attend art receptions at no charge. Artists of all ages and levels may submit their work that can be simply displayed or be for sale.

The downtown area has become home to several graffiti-style murals, including designs depicting Jeff Bridges' character the Dude from The Big Lebowski.

In 2016, the San Marcos Arts Commission erected 10 mermaid statues throughout the city. Mermaids have been part of San Marcos culture since the mid-1900s, when the former Aquarena Springs began underwater performances by women dressed as mermaids. Each mermaid statue is 7 ft tall and mounted on a limestone slab to make the final height closer 9 ft. Each mermaid is decorated by a different regional artist, and celebrates the art, culture, and natural beauty of the city.

Music
For more than 20 years, as of 2008, the San Marcos Performing Arts Commission and the San Marcos Parks and Recreation Department have hosted the Summer in the Park concert series with live music at an outdoor venue every Thursday night from June to August.

The Cheatham Street Warehouse helped launch the careers of George Strait, Stevie Ray Vaughan, Randy Rogers, Todd Snider, James McMurtry, and Terri Hendrix, among others. The Cheatham Street Foundation continues work to preserve Texas music traditions and has offered seminars on the business end of the music business.

Contributing to the music scene in San Marcos, Texas State University hosts the Hill Country Jazz Festival and Eddie Durham Celebration annually.

Film
Many television shows and movies have filmed in San Marcos, including Friday Night Lights, D.O.A., Everybody Wants Some!!, Boyhood, American Crime, That's What I'm Talking About, Piranha, The Ringer, Courage Under Fire, The New Guy, The Faculty, Idiocracy, The Getaway, The War at Home, Little Boy Blue, Flesh and Bone, Race With the Devil, and The Tree of Life.

The San Marcos Cinema Club hosts the burgeoning Lost River Film Festival, which is named for the fictional Lost River in the film Piranha, which was filmed on the San Marcos River.

Places of interest
 Alkek Library
 Bobcat Ballpark
 Bobcat Stadium
 Calaboose African American History Museum
 Cheatham Street Warehouse
 Centro Cultural Hispano de San Marcos
 Eye of the Dog Art Center
 First United Methodist Church
 Fort Street Presbyterian Church
 Freeman Ranch
 Lyndon Baines Johnson Museum of San Marcos
 Meadows Center for Water and the Environment
 Old Main
 Rio Vista Dam
 San Marcos Mill Tract
 San Marcos Outlet Malls
 Texas State University 
 Sewell Park
 Strahan Coliseum
 Wonder Cave

Notable people

Sister cities
 Monclova, Coahuila
 Santiago, Nuevo León

Notes

References

External links

 
 San Marcos Area Chamber of Commerce
 San Marcos Convention & Visitor Bureau
 San Marcos Public Library
 San Marcos Mercury newspaper
 Greater San Marcos Partnership
 U.S. Census Bureau – San Marcos, TX Quickfacts
 Story of Aquarena Springs
 Rio Vista Park Nostalgia

 
Cities in Caldwell County, Texas
Cities in Guadalupe County, Texas
Cities in Hays County, Texas
Cities in Texas
County seats in Texas
Cities in Greater Austin

Populated places established in 1808
Texas Hill Country